Cottonwood Mountain is a mountain range in Malheur County, Oregon.

References 

Mountain ranges of Oregon
Mountain ranges of Malheur County, Oregon